Parliamentary elections were held in Cyprus on 30 May 2021 to elect 56 of the 80 Members of the House of Representatives.

Electoral system
The 80 members of the House of Representatives are elected from six multi-member constituencies, with the number of seats allocated according to the population of each area. Of the 80, 56 are elected by Greek Cypriots and 24 by Turkish Cypriots. However, since 1964, the Turkish Cypriot seats are unfilled and the House of Representatives has de facto had 56 seats since its enlargement in the 1980s. Each constituency corresponds to the six districts of Cyprus.

The elections are held using open list proportional representation; voters vote for a party and can then cast one preferential vote for a candidate on their party's list for every four seats available in their constituency (party leaders or other candidates heading coalitions are not required to receive preferential votes to be elected). Seats are allocated using the Hare quota, with any remaining seats allocated to lists that won at least one seat or parties that received at least 3.6% of the vote. The current seat allocation for the 2021 election was as follows:

Parties

Opinion polls

Campaign
Anti-government demonstrations have been taking place that resulted in clashes with the police. 

Despite the COVID-19 pandemic in Cyprus, the campaign and voting process is not expected to be significantly altered.

Results

Notes

References

Cyprus
2021 in Cyprus
2020s in Cypriot politics
Legislative elections in Cyprus
May 2021 events in Europe